Robotech: Crystal Dreams is a canceled Robotech video game for the Nintendo 64 developed by GameTek.

Plot
Crystal Dreams follows the adventures of Kyle Bartley, a disgraced Robotech Defense Force veritech mecha pilot turned mercenary who fights to protect the Earth and the SDF-3 from new Zentraedi enemies.

Development
After purchasing the license for Robotech video games from Activision, GameTek pitched the game to Nintendo. Nintendo approved the project, and a team of ten was assembled to work on the game. It was announced in May 1995 as a launch games for Nintendo 64 with the working title, Robotech Academy. By mid-1996 the name had changed to Robotech: Crystal Dreams.

Nintendo provided support to GameTek in learning the Nintendo 64 hardware. According to art director Mimi Doggett, "They know we're just getting used to this new hardware, so they've been patiently supportive. They're not pushing us to get the game out - they'd rather we take our time to make sure that it's good."

Originally planned for a December 1996 release, it was rescheduled to the second quarter of 1997. Further delays went to December 1997. GameTek filed for Chapter 11 bankruptcy in early December 1997, more than two years into development, stating that development of Robotech: Crystal Dreams would not be affected by the bankruptcy. By the end of 1997 Ocean had acquired the rights to the game with a stated intent to finish and release it. However, it was canceled days after a working demo was shown at the 1998 E3 trade show. Antarctic Press produced a black and white promotional comic book that was handed out at E3 and is now considered a collectors item. GameTek was liquidated in late 1998.

Gameplay
Crystal Dreams was primarily a space fighter simulation game with some resource management elements. The main protagonist worked as a mercenary and could obtain different numbers of credits based on the type of missions completed. Between levels the player would return to base and be able to interact with a variety of other characters, buy upgrades and modify his mecha. The game also had a continuing war time line where the player could get reports of what was happening in various locations of space, and could rush to the aid of those that needed his help the most and receive more credits for it. The mecha can be transformed into three different forms: "Fighter mode", "Guardian mode", and "Battloid mode".

See also 
 Macross: Another Dimension, the canceled Japanese conversion of Crystal Dreams.

References

External links 
 
 OpusGames.com - Comic book, list of vintage magazine articles, and unfinished ROM from the developers of Crystal Dreams
 Robotech: Crystal Dreams game profile at IGN.

Cancelled Nintendo 64 games
GameTek games
Crystal Dreams
Nintendo 64-only games
Nintendo 64 games
Video games adapted into comics